Fernando Jose Perdomo (born August 17, 1980) is an American musician best known for his work as a producer and session bassist and guitarist.

Career

Fernando started his career as a session guitar player after playing in Miami Bands, Avenging Lawnmowers of Justice, Sixo, and Trophy Wife. In 1999, his guitar playing was featured in a nationwide ad campaign for Pier One Imports. In 2002, at the age of 22 he recorded most of the guitars for Cristian Castro's Amar Es. He toured with Castro throughout Latin America. Perdomo played lead guitar and piano for Soraya on her final tour. It was during this time that Perdomo joined Ed Hale and Transcendence, finally adding a permanent guitarist to the band's often-changing lineup.

In 2007 Perdomo played and served as musical director for singer-songwriter Hilary Mcrae. In 2008 Perdomo produced an album for singer/songwriter Jorge Moreno (not yet released) and an album for Andy Pratt. He scored the film Gri-Gri, which premiered at the Cannes film festival. The film featured an original song written by Jorge Moreno, Perdomo, and Marc Chourain.

In late 2008, Perdomo produced a solo album by Transcendence singer Ed Hale entitled Ballad on Third Avenue. In 2009, Perdomo's project Dreaming in Stereo released an eponymous album Hale's label, Dying Van Gogh. The album was re-released through Perdomo's own label, Forward Motion Records, in the summer of 2010.

In 2010 Fernando Perdomo and Dreaming in stereo were signed to a management deal with Bill Aucoin. shortly before Aucoin's death. The band played at SXSW 2010.

In 2012 Perdomo released his debut Solo EP, Home is Wherever You Are, produced by Chris Rodriguez. In the same year, Perdomo moved to Los Angeles and opened "Reseda Ranch Studios" in Reseda. His first project was co-producing (with Chris Price) The Soul of All Natural Things, the long-awaited second album by Linda Perhacs, for Asthmatic Kitty records. Pitchfork Media said it was "sumptuously recorded... with strings and nylon-string guitar filtering through the mix like the sunlight through the trees in her Topanga Canyon home."

In 2013, Perdomo formed Records and Tapes with Jennifer Jo Oberle. On November 16, 2013 Perdomo released "Cheese" a collaborative single with Dutch singer Linda Bloemhard of The Mo.

In 2014 Perdomo released his full-length album Warm. That same year, Perdomo became the lead guitarist for The Dirty Diamond

In July 2015, Perdomo and Cait Brennan completed sessions for Brennan's first studio album, Debutante. The 13-song album was recorded in five days. Perdomo and Brennan split production duties and played all the instruments on the album. In December 2016, Brennan and Perdomo reunited at Ardent Studios in Memphis to record the follow-up, Third. The album was released by Omnivore Recordings on April 21, 2017.

On October 12, 2015, Perdomo was in the core band for Echo In The Canyon, an all star concert at the Orpheum Theatre in Los Angeles.  The band backed up Jakob Dylan, Fiona Apple, Regina Spektor, Cat Power, and Jade Castrinos performing songs from the California Folk Rock Era.  An album and concert movie will be out Spring 2016 with Perdomo appearing on both.

In 2016, Perdomo released a solo album called Voyeurs, which was recorded in front of a live audience on Facebook.

In early 2017 Fernando formed "Fern & Celli", an improvisational duo" with crossover cellist Ruti Celli. In May 2017 they opened for Jazz Fusion Violinist Jean Luc Ponty at the Canyon Club. They released two fully improvised albums, "The Conversations" (2017) and "Language" (2019) and won "5 best acts on the cruise" after their show on "Cruise To The Edge 2019”.

In February 2017, Fernando was the musical director for an All Star Tribute to Greg Lake on Cruise To The Edge. Guests included Sonja Kristina of Curved Air, Billy Sherwood of Yes, Dave Kerzner, Nick D'Virgilio of Spocks Beard, Derek Cintron, and Leslie Hunt of District 97

Fernando's album, The Golden Hour was released by Forward Motion Records on August 17, 2017. It was recorded at Ardent Studios and Reseda Ranch Studios, and mixed and mastered by Zach Ziskin.

In November 2018 Perdomo released Zebra Crossing, with Zak Nilsson (son of Harry Nilsson), Cyndi Trissel, and Beach Boys lyricist Stephen Kalinich appearing. It was recorded at Abbey Road Studios and is Perdomo's love letter to the famous studio and includes his cover of "While My Guitar Gently Weeps".

On May 24, 2019, The Documentary film Echo In The Canyon premiered in theaters and the official Soundtrack album was released on BMG records. Fernando appears in the film as the guitarist in the backing band in most of the scenes, and he appears on every track but one on the soundtrack album.

Perdomo has a trilogy of albums called Out to Sea 1,2, and 3 on Cherry Red Records. These instrumental progressive rock albums feature cover art by Genesis artist, Paul Whitehead.

Perdomo has joined forces with Wings drummer Denny Seiwell to produce Ram On- A 50th Anniversary Tribute to Paul and Linda McCartney's Ram on Cherry Red Records. The album comes out May 14, 2021.

Perdomo has completed a record with Carmine Appice called "Energy Overload" which was released in 2021.

In 2022 Fernando became the touring guitar player for Marshall Crenshaw for his "40 Years In Showbiz" tours. 

On October 2nd 2022 Fernando was a performer in the memorial concert for Alan White. He performed 2 songs with Jon Davison. One Song with Davison and Geoff Downes, and he sat in with Yes on "Roundabout" along with electric guitarist Karl Hoag. 

Fernando composed the score for the movie "Frost" for Cleopatra entertainment. The Original Soundtrack includes Fernando's collaborations with Rick Wakeman, Geoff Downes, L Shankar and Terry Reid

On October 1st 2022. Perdomo and Karl Haug performed with Yes at Alan White's celebration of life at the Paramount Theater, filling in for Steve Howe. 

In 2023 Perdomo's bands Nine Mile Station and Life on Mars signed recording contracts with Spirit of Unicorn/Cherry Red Records. 

In 2023 Perdomo became a staff producer for Cleopatra Records.

Discography

Dreaming in Stereo (band)
2009: Dreaming in Stereo (DVG)
2010: Fill My Sky (Single)
2010: Dreaming in Stereo | re-release (Forward Motion Records)
2011: Home (Single)
2011: Dreaming in Stereo 2
2011: Forward Motion Records Live (Live Album)
 2012 Happiness (single)

Fernando Perdomo (solo)
2010: Fernando Perdomo (Guitar Instrumental)
2011: I Shall Be Released (Bob Dylan cover)
2012: Home is Wherever You Are EP
2013: "Photographers In Love Single"
2014: "Girl With A Record Collection Single"
2014: "Dreams EP"
2014: "Warm"
2014: "Immortal Single"
2014: "Live At The Hotel Cafe EP"
2015 The Third Man Record Booth EP
2016 Picks
2016 New City (single)
2016 Voyeurs 
2016 Dances With A Mysterious Blonde
2016 Bigfoot On Fairfax (EP)
2016 The Angels of Ardent (single) 
2017 Sometimes (single)
2017 The Golden Hour 
2018 Out to Sea
2018 Fernando Perdomo Has Lost His Voice
2018 Zebra Crossing
2019 Out To Sea 2
2020 Out To Sea 3
2021 TRGTR Tribute to Todd Rundgren
2021 1833
2021 Sequoia 
2021 Stars
2022 Out to Sea 4
2022 Jangle 
2022 Covers
2022 Original Soundtrack to "Frost"

With Denny Seiwell
2021 Ram On The 50th Anniversary Tribute to Paul And Linda McCartney's Ram

Appice Perdomo Project(band)
2021 Energy Overload

Records and tapes (band)
2013 "Best Type of Regret" (single)
2014 "Hard To Believe" (single)

With Linda Bloemhard
2013  "Cheese" (single)

As Reseda
2012: Postcards from Reseda

As Encino Evil
2016 Stolen Car
2017 Covfefe (single)
2018 E- Scooter (with Ken Sharp and Rob Bonfiglio)

As Stones
2016 Stones (EP)
2017 Chroma Polaris (single)

As The Black Galaxy
2016 The Black Galaxy

As producer
 Andy Pratt, Andy Pratt Loves You, (2010)
 Andy Pratt, Life & Death, (2011)
 Jorge Moreno, Thank You (Single), (2010)
 Jorge Moreno, This Town (Single), (2011)
 Jorge Moreno, Rezo Por Ti (Single), (2011)
 Alih Jey, Tarte, (2011)
 Chris Alvy Band, Art Noise, (2011)
 Dreaming in Stereo, Dreaming in Stereo (2009)
 Dreaming in Stereo, Dreaming in Stereo 2 (2011)
 Ed Hale, Ballad on Third Avenue (2009)
 The Sunrise, Spread The Word
 Elijah Cross, Flawed Designs
 Lizette Santana, Aún Sueño En Ti (2009)
 Resonance, Frequency
 Michael Isla, Sonic Self Portrait
 Greg Essence, Hola Mama (2011)
 Rachel Goodrich, Tinker Toys (one track: Little Brass Bear) (2008)
 Rachel Goodrich, Rachel Goodrich (one track: Popsicles) (2011)
 Jennifer Kaiser, Masquerade (2011)
 The Mann Sisters, The Mann Sisters EP (2011)
 Omine, Whiskey and Chocolate (2011)
 Jill Hartmann, Things I Want to Remember
 Sylvia Emmerson, For All Who Wander (2011)
 Arboles Libres, Arboles Libres (2010)
 Arboles Libres, Light Me up a Cigarette (single)
 David Packouz, Microcosm (2009)
 Gigi Denisco, Blue Skies and The Rain (single)
 Yves Giraud, Hello (2010)
 Danny Luis, Walk On (single) (2011)
 Tim Charron, Greatest Hits (2009)
 Kingsley and Perdomo, Fake Smiles (2010)
 Jason Masik, House of the Rising Sun (2010)
 Union Cell, All The Pretty Things (2011)
 Kim Drake, Surrealist Dream (2011)
 The Sunrise, We Have Not Heard (2012)
 Andrew Johnston "Teenage Paws (Fernando Perdomo Remix)" (Vinyl Single) (2013)
 The Defiant, Guilty (2013)
 Melissa Thatcher, The Streets of Silverlake (2013)
 Jim Camacho, Everywhere (2013)
 Little Dove, Little Dove (2013)
 Robert Avellanet, When I Have You (single) (2013)
 Apryl Electra's Common Ancestors- Follow The Breeze (single) (2013)
 Trudy Miquelerena – I Wanna Surrender (2013)
 Records and Tapes – Best Type of Regret (single) (2013)
 Records and Tapes – Hard to Believe (Single) (2013)
 Andy Pratt – Gonna Love You Till The Day I Die (single) (2013)
 Andy Pratt – Little Bitty Soul (single) (2013)
 Graham Marshall – Makin It on My Own (single) (2013)
 Robert Avellanet -  Heart and Soul  (2014)
 Linda Perhacs, The Soul of All Natural Things (2014)
 Andy Pratt -  The New Normal? (2014)
 Lize - I Surrender (Single) (2014)
 The Defiant - Plans and Schemes (2014)
 Nicole Marcus - Nicole Marcus (2014)
 Jawn Star - 5 Points of Light (2014)
 Alih Jey - Car Trouble (2014)
 Fernando Perdomo - Dreams (2014)
 Fernando Perdomo - Warm (2014)
 Trudy Love - Cosa  (2014)
 Gayle Skidmore - Let Me Down (single) (2014)
 Gayle Skidmore - Barrel, Trigger, Gun (single) (2014)
 Gayle Skidmore - Rag Doll (Single) (2014)
 Zak Schaffer - Part Of Your Collection (2014)
 The Dirty Diamond - From The Stars (Single) (2014)
 San Fernando - The Sound (single) (2014)
 Ex Norwegian - Wasted Lines (2014)
 Brian Jay Cline - Trick Photography (2015)
 Franco and The Dreadnought - Like Yeah, No I Don't Know (single) (2015)
 The Rosannah Sisters - Whatever Happens (2015)
 David Divad - Healing Hands (2015)
 Yves Giraud - I'm Your Light (2015)
 Jeanne Partridge - Be Your Angel (2015)
 Todd Rundgren - Collide A Scope (Fernando Perdomo Remix) (2015)
 Choix - Shine (single)  (2015)
 Life on Mars - Far (2015)
 Alih Jey - Steal Your Boyfriend (single) (2015)
 Andy Pratt - Do You Remember Me? (2015)
 Robert Avellanet -  Shine Your Light (single) (2015)
 Robert Bidney - It's All About The Love (2015)
 The Dirty Diamond - Death Of My Ego (single) (2015)
 Jacob Jeffries - Even Now (single) (2015)
 Girl, Disappearing - Temporarily In The Maya (2015)
 Choix  - "Right To Be Wrong (single) (2016)
 Brian Jay Cline - "Solid State" (2016)
 James Patrick - "The Room Of Yesterday's Tears" (single) (2016)
 Cait Brennan - Debutante, (2016)
 James Starflower - PET YOUR STEREO (2016)
 life on mars - For a Reason (2016)
 The Dirty Diamond - "Changes" (single) (2016)
 Elijah Cross - Here's The Skinny (2016)
 Ed Hale - "Tell You True" (single) (2016)
 Edan Archer - "Cruel Mother" EP (2016)
 Ken Sharp - "New Mourning"  (2016)
 Jacob Jeffries - "Limb" (single) (2016)
 Jealous Man - "LA Noir" (single) (2016)
 Jealous Man - "Down Into Egypt" (single) (2016)
 Trysette Loosemore - "Shadowgirl" (one song)  (2017)
 Brian Jay Cline - "Writers Block" (2017)
 Ken Sharp - "My Favorite Songbook" (vinyl LP) (4 songs) (2017)  
 Graham Marshall - "Mr Complicated" (2017) 
 David Batteau - "Blue Love" (single) (2017) 
 Christine Leakey - "Wanderlust Wishing Well" (one song) (2017) 
 Durga McBroom - "Queen Of Kayoss" (2017)  
 Gretchen's Wheel - "Sad Scientist" (one song) (2017) 
 David Batteau - "Misery" (single) (2017)
 Life On Mars - "The Resurrection of Ants" (one song) (2017) 
 Cait Brennan - Third, (2017) 
 Jennifer Kaiser - Closer To Red (2017)
 Linda Perhacs - I'm A Harmony (2017)
 Medicine Hat - “Sadie” (2022)
 Medicine Hat - “She Comes And She Goes” (2023)

As a session musician

 Jennifer Lopez - Que Ironia (The Remixes) (Epic Records)  2001 Nylon String Guitar
 Benny More - King Of Son (BMG) 2003 Bass, Drum Engineering
 Cristian Castro - Amar Es 2003 (RCA) Lead Guitar, Theremin
 Alih Jey - Gotas De Piel (Universal) 2004 Lead Guitar
 Elsten Torres - Individual 2006 (FM)  Electric Sitar, Guitar
 Hilary McCrae - Through These Walls (Hear Music) 2007 Bass, Guitar, Keys
 Kany Garcia - Boleto De Entrada (Universal) 2009 Lead Guitar, Ebow Guitar
 Tego Calderon - The Underdog/El Subestimado (Atlantic) Guitar
 Paulina Rubio - Gran City Pop (Universal)  Lead Guitar, Bass, Piano, Keyboards
 Juan Fernando Velasco No Mas Lead Guitar, Bass
 Kurt Riley Free, Drums

TV/filmography
 Pier One Imports, Commercial (1999)
 Catch .44, Trailer (2011)
 Melrose Place (2011)
 House, Commercial (2012)
 Dexter, Commercial (2012)
 Real Housewives of New Jersey (2012)
 Dexter, Episode "Talk to the Hand" (2012)
 Toyota RAV 4 Commercial (Perdomo singing in Italian)
 Target "Holiday Card" ad in English and Spanish
 McDonald's "Cuties" ad in Spanish
 Toyota Rav4 "Todos a La Vez" commercial
 Canvas by Land's End "Introducing Canvas by Lands End" Ad featuring "River of God" by Linda Perhacs (co written and Co produced by Fernando)
 Dunkin Donuts "Holiday Ad" 2016 Latin America
 Echo In The Canyon Documentary Film appears as himself

References

External links

 

1980 births
Living people
American male guitarists
American male singer-songwriters
American male pop singers
American rock guitarists
American rock songwriters
Guitarists from Florida
People from Miami Beach, Florida
Singer-songwriters from Florida
21st-century American singers
21st-century American guitarists
21st-century American male singers